The hasapiko (meaning “the butcher's [dance]”) is a Greek folk dance from Constantinople. The dance originated in the Middle Ages as a battle mime with swords performed by the Greek butchers' guild, which adopted it from the military of the Byzantine era. In Constantinople during the Byzantine times, it was called in Greek μακελλάρικος χορός (makellárikos horós, "butcher's dance", from μακελλάριος “butcher”). Some Greeks, however, reserve the latter term only for the fast version of the dance.

The slow version of the dance is called χασάπικο βαρύ / χασάπικος βαρύς (hasapiko vary or hasapikos varys, "heavy hasapiko") and generally employs a  meter. The fast version of the dance uses a  meter. It is variously called γρήγορο χασάπικο (grigoro hasapiko, "fast hasapiko") or χασαποσέρβικο (hasaposerviko), the last two terms in reference to Serbian and other Balkan influences on this version of the dance. The fast version is also called μακελλάριος χορός (makellarios horos),  

Sirtaki is a relatively new, choreographed version of hasapiko.

See also
Greek dances
Kalamatianos
Pyrrhichios
Serra
Sirtaki
Syrtos

References

External links 
Hasapiko description

Cultural history of Greece
Greek dances
Greek music